'

Alexis Soriano is a Spanish-Lithuanian orchestral conductor and composer. A pupil of Ilya Musin, and later of Valery Gergiev, he has been Principal Associate Conductor of The Hermitage Orchestra for ten years and is  Artistic Director of the  "Spanish Evenings Festival" in Saint Petersburg. On the invitation of Gergiev, he made his debut at the Mariinsky Theater, conducting Mozart's The Marriage of Figaro. Since 2009 he has been  Artistic Director and principal conductor of the chamber opera company, "Opera Incognita" and conducted the company's first fully staged opera, The letters of Van Gogh by Grigory Frid, at the Hermitage Theatre. The production was nominated for the Golden Mask Award. His repertoire also includes contemporary and rarely performed music, especially Spanish. He was chief conductor of INSO Lviv Symphony Orchestra between 2010 and 2012. He has conducted the first recording of José Lidón's 1792 opera,  Glaura y Cariolano. Since 2012 he has been Artistic Director of New York Opera Society. In 2014 he was elected as one of the "100 Spaniards" which excelled abroad in their own discipline. Among the orchestras he has conducted are those of the  Mariinsky Theatre, Teatro Colón, and the  Teatro Real in Madrid as well as the Lithuanian National Orchestra, Saint Petersburg Symphony, Prague Symphony, Novaya Rossia, Prague Symphony, Slovak Philharmonic, Danubia Budapest, English Chamber Orchestra, Sinfonica Minas Gerais and Taipei Symphony. As a composer his catalogue includes symphonic and chamber music, solo works, voice cycles and the Chamber Opera "Frida y Diego" of which he recently presented some fragments at  Casa de México in Spain.

 References 
https://scherzo.es/madrid-las-horas-vacias-soledad-cibernetica/

https://www.casademexico.es/musica/frida-y-diego-opera-de-camara-en-21-cuadros/

 Additional sources 
Cala, Arantxa, "El jerezano Castilla-Ávila estrenará en Alemania una ópera 'cervantina'", Diario de Jerez, 31.05.2010
Franco, Enrique, "Estrenos y premios", El País, 11.04.1993
Reverter, Arturo, "La Celestina, al fin viva", El Cultural'', 18.09.2008
Marco, Tomás, "Las horas vacías soledad cibernética", Scherzo, 13.11.21

External links
Official website
 Interview with Alexis Soriano.  Saint-Petersburg Classic Journal

Spanish conductors (music)
Male conductors (music)
Living people
21st-century conductors (music)
21st-century male musicians
Year of birth missing (living people)
Spanish male musicians